Ornativalva sieversi is a moth of the family Gelechiidae. It was described by Staudinger in 1871. It is found in southern and central European Russia, Iran and Afghanistan.

The wingspan is 15–17 mm.

The host plant is unknown, but might be a Tamarix species.

References

Moths described in 1871
Ornativalva